Moses Dobruška or Moses Dobruschka, alias Junius Frey (12 July 1753, Brno, Moravia – 5 April 1794) was a writer, poet and revolutionary. His mother was the first cousin of Jacob Frank, who claimed to be the Jewish messiah and founded the Frankist sect. 

On 17 December 1775 he converted from Judaism to the Catholic faith and took the name of Franz Thomas Schönfeld. On 25 July 1778 he was elevated to nobility in Vienna, becoming Franz Thomas Edler von Schönfeld.

In 1792, in the wake of the French Revolution, he traveled via Strasbourg to Paris and became a Jacobin, changing his name, once again, to Junius Frey. The new name derived from Junius from the Roman Junii family that fostered the famous tyrant slayer Brutus, and Frey being a transliteration of the German word for "liberty". In June 1793 he published his book Philosophie sociale, dédiée au peuple françois.

He was arrested for treason and espionage and executed by guillotine on 5 April 1794 in connection with the case against his brother-in-law François Chabot.

Notes

References 
 Greco, Silvana, Moses Dobruska and the Invention of Social Philosophy. Utopia, Judaism, and Heresy under the French Revolution. De Gruyter Oldenburg, 2022.  
 Greco, Silvana, Il sociologo eretico. Moses Dobruska e la sua Philosophie sociale (1793). Giuntina, 2021. 
 Wölfle-Fischer, Susanne, Junius Frey, 1753-1794: Jude, Aristokrat und Revolutionär. P. Lang, 1998.
 Davidowicz, Klaus Samuel, Jakob Frank, der Messias aus dem Ghetto. P. Lang, 1998.

1753 births
1794 deaths
Writers from Brno
People from the Margraviate of Moravia
Austrian people of Czech-Jewish descent
Czech Roman Catholics
Austrian Roman Catholics
Converts to Roman Catholicism from Judaism
Edlers of Austria
18th-century Austrian people
18th-century Bohemian people
Frankism
People executed by guillotine during the French Revolution
Executed Czech people
Executed Austrian people